Vítor Manuel Andrade Bastos da Silva (born 24 May 1982) is a Portuguese footballer who played as a forward.

External links
 
 

1982 births
Living people
Portuguese footballers
Association football forwards
Liga Portugal 2 players
Segunda Divisão players
FC Porto B players
C.D. Santa Clara players
Gondomar S.C. players
G.D. Chaves players
S.C. Espinho players
C.D. Cinfães players
S.C. Coimbrões players
A.D. Sanjoanense players
Portugal youth international footballers
Portuguese expatriate footballers
Expatriate footballers in Italy
Portuguese expatriate sportspeople  in Italy